John Barry Prendergast  (3 November 1933 – 30 January 2011) was a British composer and conductor of film music.

He composed the scores for eleven of the James Bond films between 1963 and 1987, as well as arranging and performing the "James Bond Theme" for the first film in the series, 1962's Dr. No. He wrote the Grammy- and Academy Award-winning scores to the films Dances with Wolves and Out of Africa, as well as the scores of The Scarlet Letter, Chaplin, The Cotton Club, Game of Death, The Tamarind Seed, Mary, Queen of Scots and the theme for the television series The Persuaders!, in a career spanning over 50 years. In 1999, he was appointed with an OBE for services to music.

Born in York, Barry spent his early years working in cinemas owned by his father. During his national service with the British Army in Cyprus, Barry began performing as a musician after learning to play the trumpet. Upon completing his national service, he formed a band in 1957, the John Barry Seven. He later developed an interest in composing and arranging music, making his début for television in 1958. He came to the notice of the makers of the first James Bond film Dr. No, who were dissatisfied with a theme for James Bond given to them by Monty Norman. Noel Rogers, the head of music at United Artists, approached Barry. This started a successful association between Barry and the Bond series that lasted for 25 years.

Barry received awards including five Academy Awards: two for Born Free and one each for The Lion in Winter (for which he also won the first BAFTA Award for Best Film Music), Out of Africa and Dances with Wolves (both of which also won him Grammy Awards). He also received ten Golden Globe Award nominations, winning once for Best Original Score for Out of Africa in 1986. Barry completed his last film score, Enigma, in 2001 and recorded the successful album Eternal Echoes the same year. He then concentrated chiefly on live performances and co-wrote the music to the musical Brighton Rock in 2004 alongside Don Black.

In 2001, Barry became a Fellow of the British Academy of Songwriters, Composers and Authors, and, in 2005, he was made a Fellow of the British Academy of Film and Television Arts. Barry was married four times and had four children. He moved to the United States in 1975 and lived there until his death in 2011.

Biography

Early life and education
Barry was born John Barry Prendergast, in York, and was the son of an English mother and an Irish father. His mother was a classical pianist. His father, John Xavier "Jack" Prendergast, from Cork, was a projectionist during the silent film era, who later owned a chain of cinemas across northern England. As a result of his father's work, Barry was raised in and around cinemas in northern England and he later stated that this childhood background influenced his musical tastes and interests. He was the youngest of four children. He had two older brothers and one older sister. Barry was educated at St Peter's School, York, and also received composition lessons from Francis Jackson, Organist of York Minster.

Career
Serving in the British Army, Barry spent his national service playing the trumpet, taking a correspondence course (with jazz composer Bill Russo). Barry after national service worked as an arranger for Jack Parnell's and Ted Heath's orchestras forming his own band in 1957, the John Barry Seven, The John Barry Seven scored hit records on the EMI's Columbia label. These included "Hit and Miss", the theme tune he composed for the BBC's Juke Box Jury programme, a cover of the Johnny Smith song "Walk Don't Run", and a cover of the theme for the United Artists western The Magnificent Seven.

By 1959 Barry was gaining commissions to arrange music for other acts, starting with a young trio on Decca, coincidentally called the Three Barry Sisters, though unrelated both to Barry and the more famous The Barry Sisters duo in America. The career breakthrough for Barry was the BBC television series Drumbeat, when he appeared with the John Barry Seven. He was employed by EMI from 1959 until 1962 arranging orchestral accompaniments for the company's singers, including Adam Faith. He also composed songs (along with Les Vandyke) and scores for films in which Faith was featured. When Faith made his first film, Beat Girl (1960), Barry composed, arranged and conducted the film score, his first. His music was later released as the UK's first soundtrack album.

Barry also composed the music for another Faith film, Never Let Go (also 1960), orchestrated the score for Mix Me a Person (1962), and composed, arranged and conducted the score for The Amorous Prawn (also 1962). In 1962, Barry transferred to Ember Records, where he produced and arranged albums.

These achievements caught the attention of the producers of a new film called Dr. No (1962) who were dissatisfied with a theme for James Bond given to them by Monty Norman. Barry was hired and the result was one of the most famous signature tunes in film history, the "James Bond Theme". (Credit goes to Monty Norman, see here.) When the producers of the Bond series engaged Lionel Bart to score the next James Bond film From Russia with Love (1963), they discovered that Bart could neither read nor write music. Though Bart wrote a title song for the film, the producers remembered Barry's arrangement of the James Bond Theme and his composing and arranging for several films with Adam Faith. Lionel Bart also recommended Barry to producer Stanley Baker for his 1964 film Zulu. That same year Bart and Barry collaborated on the film Man in the Middle; and then, in 1965, Barry worked with director Bryan Forbes in scoring the World War II prison-camp drama King Rat.

This was the turning point for Barry, and he subsequently won five Academy Awards and four Grammy Awards, with scores for, among others, Born Free (1966), The Lion in Winter (1968), Midnight Cowboy (1969) for which he did not receive an on-screen credit, and Somewhere in Time (1980).

Barry was often cited as having had a distinct style which concentrated on lush strings and extensive use of brass. However he was also an innovator, being one of the first to employ synthesizers in a film score (On Her Majesty's Secret Service, also 1969), and to make wide use of pop artists and songs in Midnight Cowboy. Because Barry provided not just the main title theme but the complete soundtrack score, his music often enhanced the critical reception of a film, notably in Midnight Cowboy, The Tamarind Seed, the first remake of King Kong (1976), Out of Africa (1985), and Dances with Wolves (1990). Barry would often watch films and would note down with pen and paper what worked or what did not.

Barry composed the theme for the TV series The Persuaders! (1971), also known as The Unlucky Heroes, in which Tony Curtis and Roger Moore were paired as rich playboys solving crimes. The instrumental recording features the cimbalom (which Barry also used for The Ipcress File (1965) and other themes) and Moog synthesizers. The theme was a hit single in many European countries (including France, Germany, and the Benelux states), contributing to the cult status of the series in Europe, and the record featured Barry's The Girl with the Sun in Her Hair on the B side, an instrumental piece featured in a long running TV advert for Sunsilk shampoo. Barry also wrote the scores to a number of musicals, including the 1965 Passion Flower Hotel (lyrics by Trevor Peacock), the successful 1974 West End show Billy (lyrics by Don Black), and two intended Broadway musicals that never opened on Broadway, Lolita, My Love (1971), with Alan Jay Lerner as lyricist, and The Little Prince and the Aviator (1981), again with lyricist Don Black. Barry also composed the soundtrack for the Bruce Lee film Game of Death (1978).

In 2001, the University of York conferred an honorary degree on Barry, and in 2002 he was named an Honorary Freeman of the City of York.

During 2006, Barry was the executive producer on an album entitled Here's to the Heroes by the Australian ensemble The Ten Tenors. The album features a number of songs Barry wrote in collaboration with his lyricist friend, Don Black. Barry and Black also composed one of the songs on Shirley Bassey's 2009 album, The Performance. The song, entitled "Our Time Is Now", is the first written by the duo for Bassey since "Diamonds Are Forever".

James Bond
After the success of Dr. No, Barry was hired to compose and perform eleven of the next fourteen James Bond films.

In his tenure with the film series, Barry's music, variously brassy and moody, achieved very wide appeal. For From Russia with Love he composed "007", an alternative James Bond signature theme, which is featured in four other Bond films (Thunderball, You Only Live Twice, Diamonds Are Forever, and Moonraker. The theme "Stalking", for the teaser sequence of From Russia with Love, was covered by colleague Marvin Hamlisch for The Spy Who Loved Me (1977). Barry also contributed indirectly to the soundtrack of the spoof version of Casino Royale (1967): his Born Free theme appears briefly in the opening sequence.

In Goldfinger (1964), he perfected the "Bond sound", a heady mixture of brass, jazz elements and sensuous melodies. There is even an element of Barry's jazz roots in the big-band track "Into Miami", which follows the title credits and accompanies the film's iconic image of the camera lens zooming toward the Fontainebleau Hotel in Miami Beach. 

Barry's love for the Russian romantic composers is often reflected in his music; in his Bond scores he unites this with brass-heavy jazz writing. His use of strings, lyricism, half-diminished chords and complex key shifting provides melancholy contrast; in his scores this is often heard in variations of the title songs that are used to underscore plot development.

As Barry matured, the Bond scores became more lushly melodic (along with other scores of his such as The Tamarind Seed and Out of Africa) as in Moonraker (1979) and Octopussy (1983). Barry's score for A View to a Kill was traditional, but his collaboration with Duran Duran for the title song was contemporary and reached number one in the United States and number two in the UK Singles Chart. Both A View to a Kill and The Living Daylights theme by A-ha blended the pop music style of the bands with Barry's orchestration. 
In 2006, A-ha's Pal Waaktaar complimented Barry's contributions: "I loved the stuff he added to the track, I mean it gave it this really cool string arrangement. That's when for me it started to sound like a Bond thing."

Barry's last score for the Bond series was The Living Daylights (1987), Timothy Dalton's first film in the series, with Barry making a cameo appearance as a conductor in the film. Barry was intended to score Licence to Kill (1989) but was recovering from throat surgery at the time, and it was considered unsafe to fly him to London to complete the score. The score was completed by Michael Kamen.

David Arnold, a British composer, saw the result of two years' work in 1997 with the release of Shaken and Stirred: The David Arnold James Bond Project, an album of new versions of the themes from various James Bond films. Arnold thanks Barry in the sleeve notes, referring to him as "the Guvnor". Almost all of the tracks were John Barry compositions, and the revision of his work met with his approval – he contacted Barbara Broccoli, producer of the then upcoming Tomorrow Never Dies, to recommend Arnold as the film's composer. Arnold also went on to score four subsequent Bond films: The World Is Not Enough, Die Another Day, Casino Royale and Quantum of Solace.

Sole compositional credit for the "James Bond Theme" is assigned to Monty Norman, who was contracted as composer for Dr. No. Nearly 40 years later, in 2001, the disputed authorship of the theme was examined legally in the High Court in London after Norman sued The Sunday Times for libel for publishing an article in 1997 in which Barry was named as the true composer; Barry testified for the defence.

In court, Barry testified that he had been handed a musical manuscript of a work by Norman (meant to become the theme) and that he was to arrange it musically, and that he composed additional music and arranged the "James Bond Theme". The court was also told that Norman received sole credit because of his prior contract with the producers. Barry said that a deal was struck whereby he would receive a flat fee of £250 and Norman would receive the songwriting credit. Barry said that he had accepted the deal with United Artists Head of Music Noel Rogers because it would help his career. Despite these claims, the jury ruled unanimously in favour of Norman.

On 7 September 2006, John Barry reiterated his claim of authorship of the theme on the Steve Wright show on BBC Radio 2.

Personal life and death
Barry was married four times. His first three marriages, to Barbara Pickard (1959–63), Jane Birkin (1965–68) and Jane Sidey (1969–78) all ended in divorce. He was married to his fourth wife, Laurie, from January 1978 until his death. The couple had a son, Jonpatrick. Barry had three daughters: Suzanne with his first wife, Barbara; Kate with his second wife, Jane; and Sian, from a relationship with Ulla Larson between the first two marriages.

In 1975, Barry moved to the US. A British judge later accused him of emigrating to avoid paying £134,000 due the Inland Revenue. The matter was resolved in the late 1980s, and Barry was able to return to the UK. He subsequently lived for many years in the United States, mainly in Oyster Bay, New York, in Centre Island on Long Island, from 1980.

Barry suffered a rupture of the esophagus in 1988, following a toxic reaction to a health tonic he had consumed. The incident rendered him unable to work for two years and left him vulnerable to pneumonia.

Barry died of a heart attack on 30 January 2011 at his Oyster Bay home, aged 77.

A memorial concert took place on 20 June 2011 at the Royal Albert Hall in London, where the Royal Philharmonic Orchestra, Shirley Bassey, Rumer, David Arnold, Wynne Evans and others performed Barry's music. Sir George Martin, Sir Michael Parkinson, Don Black, Timothy Dalton and others also contributed to the celebration of his life and work. The event was sponsored by the Royal College of Music through a grant by the Broccoli Foundation.

Awards and nominations
In 1999, Barry was made an Officer of the Order of the British Empire (OBE) for services to music. He received the BAFTA Academy Fellowship Award in 2005. In 2005, the American Film Institute ranked Barry's score for Out of Africa No. 15 on their list of the greatest film scores. His scores and original songs for the following films were nominated:
 Goldfinger (1964)
 Born Free (1966)
 The Lion in Winter (1968)
 Mary, Queen of Scots (1971) 
 The Dove (1974)
 The Deep (1977)
 Somewhere in Time (1980)
 Body Heat (1981)
 Out of Africa (1985)
 A View to a Kill (1985)
 Dances with Wolves (1990)
 Chaplin (1992)

Accolades

Grammy Award
 1969 Best Instrumental Theme for Midnight Cowboy
 1985 Best Jazz Instrumental Performance, Big Band for The Cotton Club
 1985 Best Instrumental Composition for Out of Africa
 1991 Best Instrumental Composition for Dances with Wolves

Grammy Award nominations 
 1965 Grammy Award for Best Score Soundtrack for Visual Media for Goldfinger

Emmy Award nominations
 1964 Outstanding Achievement in Composing Original Music for Television for Elizabeth Taylor in London (a 1963 television special)
 1977 Outstanding Achievement in Music Composition for a Special (Dramatic Underscore) for Eleanor and Franklin: The White House Years
 
Golden Raspberry Award
 1981 Worst Musical Score for The Legend of the Lone Ranger

Max Steiner Lifetime Achievement Award (presented by the City of Vienna)
 2009

Lifetime Achievement Award from World Soundtrack Academy (presented at the Ghent Film Festival)
 2010

In 2011, he received the Brit Award for Outstanding Contribution to Music.

Barry was inducted into the Songwriters Hall of Fame in 1998.

Filmography

Bond films
Barry worked on the soundtracks for the following James Bond films (title song collaborators in brackets):
 Dr. No (1962) – "James Bond Theme" (composed by Monty Norman) as arranged by Barry used on main and end titles, key points such as Bond's arrival in Jamaica
 From Russia with Love (title song music and lyrics by Lionel Bart) (1963)
 Goldfinger (lyrics by Anthony Newley and Leslie Bricusse) (1964)
 Thunderball (lyrics by Don Black) (1965)
 You Only Live Twice (lyrics by Leslie Bricusse) (1967)
 On Her Majesty's Secret Service (1969)
 Diamonds Are Forever (lyrics by Don Black) (1971)
 The Man with the Golden Gun (lyrics by Don Black) (1974)
 Moonraker (lyrics by Hal David) (1979)
 Octopussy – "All Time High" (lyrics by Tim Rice) (1983)
 A View to a Kill (music and lyrics by Duran Duran) (1985)
 The Living Daylights (music and lyrics by Paul Waaktaar-Savoy) (1987)
In addition, a brief excerpt from the song "Born Free" is heard during a sequence in the non-EON Productions Bond film, Casino Royale (1967).

Film and television work

 Dances with Wolves (1990) US
 Chaplin (1992)
 Year of the Comet (1992) (rejected score)
 Ruby Cairo (1992) US
 My Life (1993) US
 Indecent Proposal (1993) US
 The Specialist (1994) US
 Cry, the Beloved Country (1995)
 Across the Sea of Time (1995) US
 The Scarlet Letter (1995) US
 Swept from the Sea (1997) US
 Mercury Rising (1998) US
 Playing by Heart (1998) US
 Goodbye Lover (1998) (rejected score)
 Thomas and the Magic Railroad (2000) (rejected score)
 Enigma (2001)
 The Incredibles (2004) (rejected score)

Television film scores 
 Elizabeth Taylor in London (Grammy award nomination) (1963)
 Sophia Loren in Rome (1964)
 The Glass Menagerie (1973)
 Love Among the Ruins (1975)
 Eleanor and Franklin (1976)
 Eleanor and Franklin: The White House Years (1977)
 The War Between the Tates (1977)
 Young Joe, the Forgotten Kennedy (1977)
 The Gathering (1977)
 The Corn is Green (1979)
 Willa (1979)
 Svengali (1983)

Television themes
 Juke Box Jury (1959–1967)
 Dateline (1962)
 Impromptu (1964)
 The Newcomers (1965–1969)
 Vendetta (1966)
 The Persuaders! (1971–1972)
 The Adventurer (1972–1973)
 Orson Welles Great Mysteries (1973)
 Born Free (1974)
 USA Today: The Television Show (1988)

Musicals
 Passion Flower Hotel (1965)
 Lolita, My Love (1971), a musical comedy (text by Alan Jay Lerner) based on Vladimir Nabokov's novel Lolita
 Billy (1974)
 The Little Prince and the Aviator (1981)
 Brighton Rock (2004)

Other works
 Stringbeat (1961)
 Americans (1975)
 The Beyondness of Things (1999)
 Eternal Echoes (2001)
 The Seasons (no release date set)

Singles
(Excludes co-composed hits, e.g. Duran Duran's "A View to a Kill")
 "Hit and Miss" as The John Barry Seven plus Four, UK#10 (first charted 1960)
 "Beat for Beatniks" as The John Barry Orchestra, UK#40 (1960)
 "Never Let Go" as The John Barry Orchestra, UK#49 (1960)
 "Blueberry Hill" as The John Barry Orchestra, UK#34 (1960)
 "Walk Don't Run" as The John Barry Seven, UK#11 (1960)
 "Black Stockings" as The John Barry Seven, UK#27 (1960)
 "The Magnificent Seven" as The John Barry Seven, UK#45 (1961)
 "Cutty Sark" as The John Barry Seven, UK#35 (1962)
 "The James Bond Theme" as The John Barry Orchestra, UK#13 (1962)
 "From Russia with Love" as The John Barry Orchestra, UK#39 (1963)
 "Theme from 'The Persuaders'" as John Barry, UK#13 (1971)
His four highest-charting hits all spent more than 10 weeks in the UK top 50.

See also

References

Further reading
 Fiegel, Eddi. John Barry: A Sixties Theme: From James Bond to Midnight Cowboy (Faber & Faber: London, UK, 2012)
 Leonard, Geoff, Pete Walker and Gareth Bramley. John Barry – The Man with the Midas Touch (Redcliffe Press: Bristol, UK, 2008)

External links

 John Barry Website
 
 
 Appearance on Desert Island Discs 13 June 1999
 
 
 
 
 
 

1933 births
2011 deaths
20th-century British Army personnel
20th-century English composers
BAFTA fellows
Best Original Music BAFTA Award winners
Best Original Music Score Academy Award winners
Best Original Song Academy Award-winning songwriters
Birkin family
British male conductors (music)
Columbia Graphophone Company artists
Decca Records artists
Easy listening musicians
English film score composers
English male film score composers
English male classical composers
English musical theatre composers
English songwriters
English expatriates in the United States
English people of Irish descent
Golden Globe Award-winning musicians
Grammy Award winners
Ivor Novello Award winners
Musicians from York
Officers of the Order of the British Empire
People educated at St Peter's School, York
People from Centre Island, New York
People from Oyster Bay (town), New York